Domenico di Pace Beccafumi (1486May 18, 1551) was an Italian Renaissance-Mannerist painter active predominantly in Siena. He is considered one of the last undiluted representatives of the Sienese school of painting.

Biography
Domenico was born in Montaperti, near Siena, the son of Giacomo di Pace, a peasant who worked on the estate of Lorenzo Beccafumi. Seeing his talent for drawing, Lorenzo adopted him, and commended him to learn painting from Mechero, a lesser Sienese artist. In 1509 he traveled to Rome, where he learned from the artists who had just done their first work in the Vatican, but soon returned to Siena. However, while the Roman forays of two Sienese artists of roughly his generation (Il Sodoma and Peruzzi) had imbued them with elements of the Umbrian-Florentine Classical style, Beccafumi's style remains, in striking ways, provincial. In Siena, he painted religious pieces for churches and of mythological decorations for private patrons, only mildly influenced by the gestured Mannerist trends dominating the neighboring Florentine school. There are medieval eccentricities, sometimes phantasmagoric, superfluous emotional detail and a misty non-linear, often jagged quality to his drawings, with primal tonality to his coloration that separates him from the classic Roman masters.

Pavement of Duomo di Siena
In addition to painting, he also directed the celebrated pavement of the cathedral of Siena from 1517 to 1544, a task that took over a century and a half. The pavement shows vast designs in commesso work—white marble, that is, engraved with the outlines of the subject in black, and having borders inlaid with rich patterns in many colours. From the year Beccafumi was engaged in continuing this pavement, he made very ingenious improvements in the technical processes employed, and laid down scenes from the stories of Ahab and Elijah, of Melchisedec, of Abraham and of Moses. He made a triumphal arch and an immense mechanical horse for the procession of the emperor Charles V on his entry into Siena.

Critical assessment and legacy

Compared to the equilibrated, geometric, and self-assured Florentine style, the Sienese style of painting edges into a more irrational and emotionally unbalanced world. Buildings are often transected, and perspectives awkward. The setting is often hallucinogenic; the colors, discordant. For example, in the Nativity (Church of San Martino) hovering angels form an architectural hoop, and figures enter from the shadows of a ruined arch. In his Annunciation, the Virgin resides in a world neither in day or dusk, she and the Angel Gabriel shine while the house is in shadows. In Christ in Limbo (Pinacoteca Nazionale, Siena), an atypically represented topic, Christ sways in contrapposto as he enters a netherworld of ruins and souls. S. J. Freedberg compares his vibrant eccentric figures to those of the Florentine mannerist contemporary Rosso Fiorentino, yet more "optical and fluid". While all the elements of the expected religious scenes are here, it is like a play in which all the actors have taken atypical costumes, and forgotten some of their lines.

In Medieval Italy, Siena had been an artistic, economic, and political rival of Florence; but wars and natural disasters caused a decline by the 15th century. Stylistically, Beccafumi is among the last in a line of Sienese artists, a medieval believer of miracles awaking in Renaissance reality.

Partial anthology of works
The Miraculous Communion of St Catherine of Siena (1513) - J. Paul Getty Museum, Los Angeles 
Saint Catherine of Siena Receiving the Stigmata (1513) - J. Paul Getty Museum, Los Angeles
Trinity Triptych (1513) - Oil on wood, 152 x 228 cm, Pinacoteca Nazionale, Siena 
Holy Family with the Infant Saint John the Baptist (c.1514-1515) -  Uffizi, Florence
Marriage of St Catherine (1514–1515) -  Pinacoteca Nazionale, Siena
Bellanti Madonna (c.1515) -  Pinacoteca Nazionale, Siena
St. Paul (1515) - Oil on wood, 190 x 150 cm, Museo dell'Opera Metropolitana, Siena
Marcia (1519), National Gallery, London
Stigmatization of St. Catherine of Siena (1515) - Oil on wood, 208 x 156 cm, Pinacoteca Nazionale, Siena
The Betrothal of the Virgin (1518) - Fresco, 295 x 304 cm, Oratory of San Bernardino, Siena
Tanaquil (1519) - Oil on wood, 92 x 53 cm, National Gallery, London
Self Portrait (1520)
The Story of Papirius (1520-1530) -National Gallery, London
St. Lucy (1521) - Oil on wood, Pinacoteca Nazionale, Siena
Mystical Marriage of St. Catherine (1521) - Hermitage, St. Petersburg
Holy Family with the Infant Saint John the Baptist (c.1521-1522) -Galleria Palatina, Florence
Frescoes -Palazzo Bindi-Segardi, Siena
Frescoes of scenes from Roman historyPalazzo Pubblico, Siena (1529–1535)
The Holy Family with Young Saint John (1523–1524) - Oil on panel, diameter 86 cm, Museo Thyssen-Bornemisza, Madrid
Fall of the Rebel Angels (c. 1524) -Pinacoteca Nazionale, Siena
Fall of the Rebel Angels (c. 1528) - Oil on wood, 347 x 225 cm, San Niccolò al Carmine, Siena
Mystic Marriage of Saint Catherine (1528) -Palazzo Chigi-Saracini, Siena
Vision of St. Catherine of Sienna (1528) - Philbrook Museum of Art, Tulsa
The Baptism of Christ (1528) -Philbrook Museum of Art, Tulsa
The Nativity - Allentown Art Museum, Allentown
Venus and Cupid with Vulcan (1528) - New Orleans Museum of Art, New Orleans
Holy Family with St. John (c. 1530) -Oil on panel, diameter 84 cm, Uffizi,  Florence
Holy Family with Saint Anne - Private collection 
Flight of Clelia and the Roman Virgins - Uffizi, Florence
Punishment of Dathan - Pisa Cathedral
Drawing for Christ in Limbo (Stolen)
Christ in Limbo (1535) - Pinacoteca Nazionale, Siena
Moses and the Golden Calf (1536–1537) - Oil on wood, 197 x 139 cm, Pisa Cathedral
Saint Bernard of Siena Preaching  (1537) - Musée du Louvre, Paris
Saint Anthony and the Miracle of the Mule (1537) - Musée du Louvre, Paris
Saint Francis receives the stigmata (1537) - Musée du Louvre, Paris
Coronation of the Virgin (1539) -Pinacoteca Nazionale, Siena
Birth of the Virgin (1543) - Oil on wood, 233 x 145 cm, Accademia, Siena
Sarteano Annunciation (c.1546) - Oil on canvas, San Martino in Foro, Sarteano
Coronation of the Virgin (1540s) - Santo Spirito, Siena
Madonna with infant and St. John (1540) - Oil on panel, 90 x 65 cm, Galleria Nazionale d'Arte Antica, Rome
Holy Family with Angels - National Gallery of Art, Washington, DC
Holy Family and St. John - Alte Pinakothek, Munich
Statues of Angels (1548–1550) - Presbytery of Siena Cathedral
Judith with the Head of Holofernes - The Wallace Collection, London.
 Drawing of Abraham
 St. Peter - -Woodcut, Cleveland Museum of Art
 Angels drawing (1524–25) -San Francisco

Gallery

References
Painting in Italy 1500–1600, S.J. Freedberg, (Penguin History of Art, 2nd Edition, 1983).

Notes

External links

 Domenico Beccafumi in the "A World History of Art"
 Domenico di Pace Beccafumi. paintings

Italian Renaissance painters
Italian Mannerist painters
Painters from Siena
1486 births
1551 deaths
Italian male painters
People from Castelnuovo Berardenga
16th-century Italian painters